The Cougar II Stakes is a Grade III American Thoroughbred horse race for three-year-olds over a distance of one and one-half miles on the dirt, scheduled annually in late July or early August at Del Mar Racetrack in Del Mar, California. The event currently carries a purse of $150,000.

History

The event was inaugurated during the first racing season at Del Mar race track on 31 July 1937 as the Escondido Handicap over a distance of six furlongs for horses three-year-old or older. The event was an under card event on Del Mar Handicap day. The winner was Clean Out and the second and third place getters were mares. The event was held once more in 1938 but was interrupted for 11 years and did not resume until 1949 as a event for three-year-old fillies. In 1950 the event was held for two-year-olds as the Escondido Stakes.
The event was idle for three years from 1952 and when it was resumed in 1955 the distance was set to  miles.

In 1956 the Irish-bred Poona set a new track record for the -mile distance of 1:40.20.  

In 1962 the event was moved to the new turf track and run over the mile and one-eighth distance.

Between 1963 and 1984 the event was held in split divisions eight times. 

From 1976 to 1988 the event was held over the mile and one-sixteenth distance with the exception of 1984 when it was held over  furlongs and in 1985 when the event was not held due to a boycott by trainers. 

In 2007 the event was renamed in honor of National Museum of Racing and Hall of Fame inductee, the Chilean-bred Cougar II as the Cougar II Handicap who had set a course record when winning this event in 1970. 

The race from 1988 to 2007 was run as an overnight restricted handicap for horse three-years-old who had not won a sweepstakes during the year over a distance of  miles. 

In 2008 the event was moved to the new Polytrack artificial dirt surface which was installed at the track and the distance of the event was extended to  miles. The event continued to be held on this surface until 2014. 

In 2010 the event was classified by the American Graded Stakes Committee as a Grade III race. 

The winner had automatic qualification for a berth in the Breeders' Cup Marathon before that race was discontinued in 2013.

In 2020 due to the COVID-19 pandemic in the United States, the event was canceled and not rescheduled.

In 2021 the conditions of the event changed from a handicap to stakes with allowances and hence the name of the race was modified to Cougar II Stakes.

Records

Time record: 
 miles (dirt): 2:30.09 – Heywoods Beach (2022) 
 miles (polytrack): 2:29.01  – Irish Surf (2014) (Track record)
 miles (turf): 2:12.06 -	†Laura's Lucky Boy (2005)
 miles (turf): 1:49.00 -	Cougar II (CHI) (1970)
 miles (turf): 1:42.00 - Advocatum (1981)
 miles (dirt): 1:40.20 - Poona II (IRE) (1956) (Track record)
 furlongs (turf): 1:27.40 - Buck Price (1975)

Margins:
 lengths:  – Irish Surf (2014)  

Most wins:
 2 – Big John A (1968, 1969)
 2 – Dowty (1997, 1998)
 2 – Richard's Kid (2012, 2013)

Most wins by an owner:
 3 – Juddmonte (1988, 1991, 2002)
 3 –  Glen Hill Farm  (1974, 1977, 2003)
 3 – Gary A. Tanaka (1996, 2004, 2007)

Most wins by a jockey:
 4 – Fernando Toro (1970, 1978, 1987, 1988)
 4 – Rafael Bejarano (2012, 2015, 2018, 2019)

Most wins by a trainer:
 4 – Robert J. Frankel (1975, 1991, 1993, 2002)
 4 – Richard E. Mandella (1987, 2001, 2005, 2021)
 4 – John W. Sadler (2008, 2016, 2019, 2022)

Winners

Legend:

 
 
 

Notes:

§ Ran as an entry

ƒ Filly or Mare
 
‡ In 1949 the event was for three-year-old fillies

♯ In 1950 the event was for two-year-olds as Escondido Stakes

† In the 2005 running, Sarafan was first past the post but was disqualified for interference in the straight and Laura's Lucky Boy was declared the winner.

See also
List of American and Canadian Graded races

External links
 2022 Del Mar Media Guide

References

Del Mar Racetrack
Horse races in California
Graded stakes races in the United States
Open middle distance horse races
Recurring sporting events established in 1937
Grade 3 stakes races in the United States
1937 establishments in California